Matthew Ray Prokop (born July 29, 1990) is an American former actor. He is best known for his role as Jimmie "The Rocket Man" Zara in High School Musical 3: Senior Year and Josh Rosen in the Disney Channel's Geek Charming.

Early life
Prokop was born in Victoria, Texas, and moved to Los Angeles at the age of 16 to pursue his acting career.

Career
In 2011, Prokop was represented by Management 360 and APA. His first acting job was a brief appearance on Hannah Montana in 2007, followed by a walk-on role on The Office. 

He guest starred on Medium (2009) as Kyle "K.C." Covington for one episode. Prokop landed a role in Furry Vengeance (2010), playing Brendan Fraser's son, and he played the role of Josh Rosen in the Disney Channel's Geek Charming (2011), based on author Robin Palmer's novel.

In 2012, he appeared in an episode of Modern Family, opposite then girlfriend and series regular Sarah Hyland. His last acting appearance was in the 2013 film April Apocalypse, with his last three film roles being in films starring Hyland.

Personal life
Prokop dated his Geek Charming co-star Sarah Hyland for several years until August 2014, when she left him and filed a temporary restraining order against him for physically and verbally abusing her throughout their four-year relationship. In October 2014, a permanent restraining order was granted, and Prokop has not worked in the film or television industries since.

Filmography

Film

Television

Discography

References

External links

1990 births
Male actors from Texas
American male child actors
American male film actors
American male television actors
Living people
21st-century American male actors
People from Victoria, Texas